John Musisi Senyonyi is a mathematician, academic, evangelist and academic administrator in Uganda. He is the immediate past Vice Chancellor of Uganda Christian University, a private university that was accredited by the Uganda National Council of Higher Education (UNCHE), in 1997. He was appointed to that position in 2010. Following ten continuous years in that position, he resigned, and handed over to Aaron Mushengyezi, in August 2020.

Background and education
He was born in Nakasongola District, in 1956, to Eriakimu Kajja, a schoolteacher and Mrs. Kajja, a full-time housewife. He is one of thirteen siblings. One of his brothers the late Peter Nyombi, Uganda's former Attorney General and former Member of Parliament for "Buruuli County" in Nakasongola District.

From 1961 until 1968, Senyonyi attended Nakasongola Primary School and later Bbowa Church of Uganda Primary School. From 1969 until 1972, he attended Ndejje Senior Secondary School for his O-Level education. He then transferred to Kings College Buddo, for his A-Level education, from 1973 until 1974. In 1975, he was admitted to the University of Nairobi, where he studied Mathematics, graduating with the degree of Bachelor of Science in Mathematics in 1978. Later, he obtained the Certificate in Management, from the International College of Management, Sydney, in Australia. He also holds the degree of Master of Arts in Theology, from Trinity International University, in the United States, obtained in 1992. His degree of Doctorate in Mathematical Statistics, was obtained from the University of Melbourne, in Australia, in 1984.

Work history
In 1978, Senyonyi returned to Uganda and began lecturing at Makerere University, the largest and oldest of Uganda's public institutions of higher education. He left to study in Australia, between 1979 and 1984, returning to continue teaching at Makerere. He left Makerere in 1988 and for 13 years, until 2000, he traveled the world preaching the gospel with an organisation called African Evangelistic Enterprise. He traveled mainly within Africa and in the United States, but also in Europe.

In 2001, he joined Uganda Christian University as the University Chaplain. Two and half years later, in 2003, he transitioned to Deputy Vice Chancellor for Finance and Administration. Three years after that, in 2006, he was appointed to the newly created position of Deputy Vice Chancellor for Development and External Relations. He served in that capacity until September 2010 when he was appointed Vice Chancellor of Uganda Christian University; the second Vice Chancellor in the history of the institution. In 2020 he retired from the University service as the second Vice Chancellor since the University's inception. He remains in the service of God and the church as an active Evangelist. He is married to the Canon Dr. Ruth Senyonyi who has also served the church for many years as the provincial Mothers Union President for the Church of Uganda.

See also

Other considerations
Senyonyi is a married father with one daughter and three sons. He is an ordained Reverend in the Church of Uganda.

References

External links
    Revival Has Leapt Across An Ocean

Living people
Ganda people
1956 births
University of Nairobi alumni
University of Melbourne alumni
International College of Management, Sydney alumni
Trinity International University alumni
People from Nakasongola District
People from Central Region, Uganda
Ugandan Christians
Vice-chancellors of universities in Uganda
Ugandan mathematicians
Academic staff of Uganda Christian University